Luis Ramos (born January 18, 1981) is a Brazilian mixed martial artist who last competed in 2016. A professional since 2000, he competed for the UFC and DEEP.

Mixed martial arts career

Shooto Brazil
Ramos compiled an undefeated record in Shooto Brazil and won his first title against Igor Fernandes in 2009. One year later he won the Brazilian Shooto 168 lb Championship.

Ramos later vacated his title to compete in the Ultimate Fighting Championship.

Ultimate Fighting Championship
Ramos made his UFC debut replacing the injured Mike Swick against Erick Silva on August 27, 2011 at UFC 134: Silva vs. Okami. He lost the bout via TKO in the first round.

Ramos was expected to face Matthew Riddle on December 30, 2011 at UFC 141: Lesnar vs. Overeem. However, the fight was called off as Riddle became ill and had to pull out just moments before the fight took place.

Ramos/Riddle was expected to finally take place on June 22, 2012 at UFC on FX 4: Maynard vs. Guida. However, Riddle was forced out of the bout due to injury and was replaced by Matt Brown. Ramos lost via TKO in the second round and was subsequently released from the promotion.

Road Fighting Championship
Ramos made his debut on April 13, 2013 at Road FC 11 against Jung Hwan Cha. The bout ended in a draw.

Championships and accomplishments

Mixed martial arts
Shooto Brazil
Shooto South American Middleweight (168 lb) Championship (2009)
Watch Out Combat Show
Watch Out Combat Show 11 Welterweight Grand Prix Winner (2011)

Mixed martial arts record

|- 
| Loss
| align=center| 20-10-2
| David Bielkheden
| TKO (punches)
| Superior Challenge 14: Stockholm
| 
| align=center| 3
| align=center| 2:13
| Stockholm, Sweden
|
|- 
| Loss
| align=center| 20-9-2
| Joilton Santos
| Decision (split)
| Shooto Brazil 58: Fight for BOPE 5
| 
| align=center| 3
| align=center| 5:00
| Rio de Janeiro, Brazil
| 
|- 
| Draw
| align=center| 20-8-2
| Hoon Kim
| Draw (majority)
| Road FC 18
| 
| align=center| 3
| align=center| 5:00
| Seoul, South Korea
| 
|-
| Draw
| align=center| 20–8–1
| Jung Hwan Cha
| Draw
| Road FC 11
| 
| align=center| 3
| align=center| 5:00
| Seoul, South Korea
| 
|-
| Win
| align=center| 20–8
| Silmar Nunes
| Decision (unanimous)
| Web Fight Combat
| 
| align=center| 3
| align=center| 5:00
| Rio de Janeiro, Brazil
| 
|-
| Loss
| align=center| 19–8
| Matt Brown
| TKO (knees and punches)
| UFC on FX: Maynard vs. Guida
| 
| align=center| 2
| align=center| 4:20
| Atlantic City, New Jersey, United States
| 
|-
| Loss
| align=center| 19–7
| Erick Silva
| KO (punches)
| UFC 134: Silva vs. Okami
| 
| align=center| 1
| align=center| 0:40
| Rio de Janeiro, Brazil
| 
|-
| Win
| align=center| 19–6
| Dimitri Burgo
| Submission (arm-triangle choke)
| Watch Out Combat Show 14
| 
| align=center| 1
| align=center| 2:13
| Rio de Janeiro, Brazil
| 
|-
| Win
| align=center| 18–6
| Mauro Chimento Jr.
| TKO (retirement)
| Watch Out Combat Show 11
| 
| align=center| 2
| align=center| 5:00
| Campo Grande, Mato Grosso do Sul, Brazil
| Won WOCS 11 Welterweight Grand Prix.
|-
| Win
| align=center| 17–6
| Edval Pedroso
| Decision (unanimous)
| Watch Out Combat Show 11
| 
| align=center| 3
| align=center| 5:00
| Campo Grande, Mato Grosso do Sul, Brazil
| 
|-
| Loss
| align=center| 16–6
| Roan Carneiro
| Decision (unanimous)
| United Glory: 2010-2011 World Series Quarterfinals
| 
| align=center| 3
| align=center| 5:00
| Amsterdam, Netherlands
| 
|-
| Win
| align=center| 16–5
| Igor Fernandes
| Decision (unanimous)
| Shooto Brazil 17
| 
| align=center| 3
| align=center| 5:00
| Rio de Janeiro, Brazil
| Won Shooto Brazil 168 lb Championship.
|-
| Win
| align=center| 15–5
| Marcelo Brito
| Decision (unanimous)
| Power Fight Extreme
| 
| align=center| 3
| align=center| 5:00
| Curitiba, Paraná, Brazil
| 
|-
| Win
| align=center| 14–5
| Igor Fernandes
| Decision (unanimous)
| Shooto Brazil 13
| 
| align=center| 3
| align=center| 5:00
| Fortaleza, Ceará, Brazil
| Won Shooto South American Middleweight (168 lb) Championship.
|-
| Loss
| align=center| 13–5
| Pedro Irie
| KO (punch)
| Max Fight 6
| 
| align=center| 1
| align=center| 0:50
| Campinas, São Paulo, Brazil
| 
|-
| Win
| align=center| 13–4
| Igor Fernandes
| TKO (punches)
| Shooto Brazil 12
| 
| align=center| 2
| align=center| 3:18
| Rio de Janeiro, Brazil
| 
|-
| Win
| align=center| 12–4
| Rodrigo Freitas
| TKO (corner stoppage)
| Shooto Brazil 10
| 
| align=center| 2
| align=center| 5:00
| Rio de Janeiro, Brazil
| 
|-
| Win
| align=center| 11–4
| Carlos Galvão
| Decision (unanimous)
| Max Fight 5
| 
| align=center| 3
| align=center| 5:00
| Campinas, São Paulo, Brazil
| 
|-
| Win
| align=center| 10–4
| Julio César de Almeida
| Decision (unanimous)
| Rio FC 1
| 
| align=center| 3
| align=center| N/A
| Rio de Janeiro, Brazil
| 
|-
| Loss
| align=center| 9–4
| Luiz Dutra Jr.
| Decision (unanimous)
| Cassino Fight 4
| 
| align=center| 3
| align=center| 5:00
| Manaus, Amazonas, Brazil
| 
|-
| Win
| align=center| 9–3
| Luciano Azevedo
| Decision (unanimous)
| Top Fighting Championships 3
| 
| align=center| 3
| align=center| 5:00
| Rio de Janeiro, Brazil
| 
|-
| Loss
| align=center| 8–3
| Luciano Azevedo
| Decision (unanimous)
| Super Challenge 1
| 
| align=center| 2
| align=center| 5:00
| Barueri, São Paulo, Brazil
| 
|-
| Win
| align=center| 8–2
| Maurício Reis
| Decision
| Top Fighter MMA
| 
| align=center| 3
| align=center| N/A
| Rio de Janeiro, Brazil
| 
|-
| Win
| align=center| 7–2
| Hitoyo Kimura
| Decision (majority)
| DEEP: clubDeep Nagoya: MB3z Impact, Di Entrare
| 
| align=center| 2
| align=center| 5:00
| Nagoya, Aichi, Japan
| 
|-
| Win
| align=center| 6–2
| Paulo Teixeira
| Decision (split)
| XFG: X Fight Games
| 
| align=center| 3
| align=center| 5:00
| Brazil
| 
|-
| Win
| align=center| 5–2
| Everaldo Sadan
| Submission (strikes)
| Shooto Brazil 8
| 
| align=center| 1
| align=center| N/A
| Brazil
| 
|-
| Win
| align=center| 4–2
| Emerson Graxaim
| TKO
| Shooto Brazil 7
| 
| align=center| N/A
| align=center| N/A
| Brazil
| 
|-
| Win
| align=center| 3–2
| Paulo Roberto Nogueira
| Decision
| Shooto Brazil 6
| 
| align=center| N/A
| align=center| N/A
| Curitiba, Paraná, Brazil
| 
|-
| Loss
| align=center| 2–2
| Felipe Arinelli
| Decision (unanimous)
| Papucaia Fight
| 
| align=center| 3
| align=center| 5:00
| Cachoeiras de Macacu, Rio de Janeiro, Brazil
| 
|-
| Win
| align=center| 2–1
| Lamar Silva
| Submission (strikes)
| AFC Brazil 1
| 
| align=center| 1
| align=center| 1:00
| Nova Friburgo, Rio de Janeiro, Brazil
| 
|-
| Loss
| align=center| 1–1
| Fabrício Madeirada
| Decision
| Gladiador 5
| 
| align=center| N/A
| align=center| N/A
| Salvador, Bahia, Brazil
| 
|-
| Win
| align=center| 1–0
| Rogério Sagate
| Submission (exhaustion)
| Brazilian Gladiators 1
| 
| align=center| 1
| align=center| N/A
| São Paulo, Brazil
|

References

External links
 
 

1981 births
Living people
Brazilian male mixed martial artists
Welterweight mixed martial artists
Sportspeople from Rio de Janeiro (city)
Ultimate Fighting Championship male fighters